Jerome "Jeff Smith" Jefferds (April 23, 1891 – February 3, 1962) was an American professional boxer who held the Australian version of the World Middleweight Title during his career. Despite his relative anonymity, Smith faced off against some the best fighters of his era, including Harry Greb, Gene Tunney, Mike Gibbons, Georges Carpentier, Les Darcy and Tommy Loughran. Statistical boxing website BoxRec lists Smith as the 17th greatest middleweight ever, while Ring Magazine founder Nat Fleischer ranked Smith as the No. 10 Middleweight of all-time. He was inducted into the Ring Magazine hall of fame in 1969 and the International Boxing Hall of Fame in 2013.

Early career

Smith made his pro debut in 1910 (the same year of the death of famed Middleweight Champion Stanley Ketchel), beating Ray Hatfield by newspaper decision over four rounds. On February 20, 1912, Smith beat future World Middleweight Title holder George Chip on points over fifteen rounds in what turned out to be a heated battle. His next notable challenge was against another future Middleweight titleholder in Mike Gibbons, with whom he drew over 10 rounds as decided by newspaper reporters. On October 11, 1913, Smith faced yet another future champion in French fighter and future Light Heavyweight champ Georges Carpentier. Despite a late rally by Smith, Carpentier used his vaunted technique beat him decisively in a twenty round decision.

Australian World Middleweight Champion
Earning his nickname as the "Bayonne Globetrotter", Smith faced Eddie McGoorty in Australia, losing an extremely unpopular decision over twenty rounds. The decision was so despised that it was later rescinded, and Smith was awarded the Australian version of the World Middleweight Title. Smith would lose the title to Australian pugilist Mick King on November 28, 1914 but regained it just one month later on December 26 of the same year. On January 23, 1915 Smith faced famed Australian fighter Les Darcy, beating him by disqualification after Darcy's handlers threw in a towel in protest to what they claimed was a low blow by Smith. Smith thus maintained his status as Australian champion, but Darcy would later exact his revenge, beating Smith via disqualification for repeated low blows.

Later career

During his career, Smith had a tremendous rivalry with the legendary Harry Greb; with the two squaring of a total of seven times. Although he lost six times and drew once against the "Pittsburgh Windmill", Greb had great respect for Smith; stating "My toughest fight was with Jeff Smith. (Tommy) Gibbons gave me a hard battle, but nothing like the Smith beating." Also notable was his tetra-logy of fights with Mike Gibbons, resulting in one win and three losses. Near the end of his career, Smith faced the fabled Gene Tunney; losing a clear decision to the much larger "Fighting Marine" after being knocked down twice. Smith retired after being knocked out for the third time by Cuban Bobby Brown on November 18, 1927.

Professional boxing record
All information in this section is derived from BoxRec, unless otherwise stated.

Official Record

All newspaper decisions are officially regarded as "no decision" bouts and are not counted in the win/loss/draw column.

Unofficial record

Record with the inclusion of newspaper decisions in the win/loss/draw column.

Life after boxing

After retiring, he became a physical education instructor with the Bayonne Board of Education and the Fort Dix New Jersey Army Base, he also taught boxing lessons at the local YMCA.

References

External links

|-

Only Recognized in Australia

|-

Only Recognized in Australia

|-

1891 births
1962 deaths
Boxers from New York (state)
Middleweight boxers
International Boxing Hall of Fame inductees
American male boxers